KHMO (1070 AM) is a radio station in Hannibal, Missouri, United States. The station airs a news-talk format and is owned by Townsquare Media.

External links
 

News and talk radio stations in the United States
HMO
Townsquare Media radio stations
Radio stations established in 1941